Fork in the road may refer to:

 Fork (intersection), the point at which a road branches into two
 Fork in the road (metaphor), a metaphor for making a decision

Film and television
 A Fork in the Road (TV series), a 1992–2006 Australian travel television series
 A Fork in the Road (film), a 2009 film directed by Jim Kouf

Music
 "A Fork in the Road" (song), by the Miracles, 1965
 "Fork in the Road", a song by Lillix in their album Falling Uphill, 2003
 "Fork in the Road", a song by 1200 Techniques in their album Consistency Theory, 2004
 "Fork in the Road", a song by Jandek in his album Khartoum, 2005
 "Fork in the Road", a song by dead prez and Outlawz in their album Can't Sell Dope Forever, 2006
 Fork in the Road (The Infamous Stringdusters album), 2007
 Fork in the Road, an album by Neil Young, 2009

See also
 Forks of the Road (disambiguation)
 Fork (disambiguation)
 Crossroads (disambiguation)